Arrasando (English: Razing) is the seventh studio album by Mexican singer Thalía, released on 25 April 2000, by EMI Latin. She collaborated with producers like Emilio Estefan, Roberto Blades and Lawrence Dermer. In many interviews during the album launch, Thalía said that this album was different from her previous ones, because it shows her turn to a more dance/techno-influenced sound, describing it as a fusion between many types of music. Thalía co-wrote eight songs on the album, in addition, it includes two covers: the South African hit "Pata Pata" and Gloria Estefan's "Lucky Girl".

The album received positive reviews around the world, increasing her fame as an international pop star. It became a smash hit album for Thalía. It received two nominations at the Latin Grammy Awards of 2001 for Female Pop Vocal Album and Best Engineered Album and won the Grammy in the latter one. Arrasando was also nominated for Pop Album of the Year at the Lo Nuestro Awards of 2001. , the album had sold close to 2 million copies worldwide, becoming in one of the best-selling "Latin" albums.

Background and recording 
In 1997, Thalía released her fifth studio album, Amor a la Mexicana, which was certified 2× Platinum in Argentina, Chile, Spain and the United States. Later, she starred the Mexican telenovela Rosalinda, in 1999. During this time, the singer started recording her sixth album, claiming that, "she wanted to prepare a quality product, so it took almost a year to make it. It's true that it took a while but it worth the wait, because it comes as the album title says, 'triumphing' strongly internationally". For the album, Thalía wrote eight tracks, with the help of other songwriters, such as Kike Santander and Roberto Blades, whilst Emilio Estefan Jr. produced the album. EMI Latin's press manager Rosario Valeriano claimed that, "All we know is that Mr. Stefan trusted Thalía, when it comes to writing her own music, and this shows that aside from singing very well, she can also show how good she is on the writing part". In order to promote Arrasando, Thalía visited several countries in the Americas, Europe and Asia.

Composition 
In Arrasando, Thalia experiments with different music genres, besides the traditional latin pop, the album also takes large influence on dance-pop and rap. Lyrically, it is an album that deals with her own life experiences. EMI's press manager claimed that, "This album, which has 12 tracks, will supply everyone's needs, because it has Latin tracks, such as the Brazilian batucada, and others that they will enjoy." He further added, "Something that people will like is a song in the vein of Cher, where Thalia does an excellent job. Actually, this song and the other ones have different styles." Thalia herself commented about the album's multiple styles, saying, "My music has always been Latin pop, but in this record it has a dance vibe, a little bit of rap and R&B, in a way that they blend perfectly."

The album opens with the slow ballad "Entre el mar y una estrella" ("Between the Sea and a Star"), which was praised by critics, who called it a "majestic" song. "Regresa a mí" ("Come Back to Me") follows, with its dance-pop style and Thalia's autotuned vocals, while the third track "Reencarnación" ("Reincarnation"), co-written by Draco Rosa, is a heavily dance-inspired track about reincarnation. The fourth and title track, the techno-infused "Arrasando" ("Razing"), was considered "tailor-made for peak-hour club play". The fifth track is the soothing "No Hay Que Llorar" ("There's no Need to Cry"), while "Tumba la Casa" follows the high-energy style of previous songs. The album also recorded a version of Miriam Makeba's hit "Pata Pata", while the closing track, "Rosalinda", the theme song of Thalía's soap opera of the same name, being the most traditionally Mexican song on the set.

Critical reception 

The album received mainly positive reviews from music critics. Jason Birchmeier of Allmusic gave the album a rating of 3.5. out of 5 stars, claiming that Arrasando, "firmly established her as a full-fledged superstar in 2000," calling the album "a trendy one, very much of its time – that is, right at the turn of the millennium, when high-intensity, trancy dance music was all the rage in fashionable circles." Birchemeier also noted the "abundance of synthesizers and dance beats, as well as its ecstatic choruses, which seem to reach for the stars song after song." He also noted that "it certainly differs from its predecessor (Amor a la Mexicana) and successor (Thalia). All are among her best efforts, with Arrasando being probably the most contrived. It's more adventurous than the streamlined Thalia, yet it's not as free-flowing as Amor a la Mexicana. Of the three, it surely sounds the most dated, and for all these reasons, it's a strangely curious album, very evocative of its time."
 
Joey Guerra wrote for Amazon.com that the album is "the singer¹s most focused collection to date", where "Thalia and Estefan blend salsa, rap, reggae, cumbia, and aggressive club beats into one irresistible mix." Guerra called the songs "Regresa a Mi", "Pata Pata", and "Siempre Hay Carino" "infectious", claiming that "Thalia proves equally adept at ballads, particularly on the majestic first single, 'Entre el Mar y una Estrella'." "Arrasando" was nominated for two Latin Grammy Awards of 2001, one in Best Female Pop Vocal Album (losing to Christina Aguilera's debut Spanish album Mi Reflejo) and "Best Engineered Album" (which it won). It was also nominated for Pop Album of the Year at the Lo Nuestro Awards of 2001, losing to Paulina by fellow Mexican singer Paulina Rubio.

Commercial performance 
According to Billboard, Thalía received multiple certifications for its sales in the United States and Latin American. Arrasando was a success on the charts, debuting at number-one on the Latin Pop Albums chart and number 4 on the Top Latin Albums chart; both component of Billboard charts. It fared even better on the Argentina, Mexico and Spain charts, peaking at number-one. The album was also certified 2× Platinum by RIAA, for selling over 200,000 copies in the United States alone. The album topped the Czech charts and its singles were very popular on the radio there.

In Mexico, the record sold 151,892 in the first six months by October 2000. In Spain, the album sold 100,000 in the first 15 days, for which was certified with a Platinum record. It was later certified double platinum for shipments of 200,000 copies there.

According to the journal Vértigo: análisis y pensamiento de México (2001), Arrasando led Thalía be the first Latin woman selling an album in Japan and also she entered commercially for the first time in markets such as Canada, Italy, Switzerland, Turkey, Lithuania and the Arab world. According to American journalist Larry Flick from Billboard and with only two month after release, EMI reported sales of 600,000 copies worldwide as June 2000. Since its debut, Arrasando has sold around 2 million copies worldwide.

Singles 
The album's lead-single "Entre el mar y una estrella" was released on 28 March 2000. The ballad became a success on the chart, peaking at number-one on the Hot Latin Tracks, Latin Pop Airplay and Latin Tropical/Salsa Airplay charts. The album's second single "Regresa a mí" peaked moderately on the charts in the US, on the Hot Latin Tracks, it peaked at number 19, on the Latin Pop Airplay, it peaked at number 12. In Mexico the song topped the charts. The third single, the title track "Arrasando", only went to peak at number 25 on the US Latin Pop Airplay chart but again, it was another number one single in Mexico. A version in English, called "It's My Party", was also released. "Menta Y Canela" was released as the fourth single in countries like Mexico and Brazil, while "Pata Pata" was released only in Argentina.

The album's fifth single "Reencarnación" fared a little better, peaking at number 30 on the Hot Latin Tracks and number 17 on the Latin Pop Airplay. The sixth single, "Rosalinda", charted on the Hot Latin Tracks at number 46, on the Latin Pop Airplay at number 23 and on the Latin Tropical/Salsa Airplay at number 37.

Track listing

Standard edition 

 "Suerte en Mi" is a Spanish version of Gloria Estefan's "Lucky Girl" from her album Gloria!.

Charts

Weekly Charts

Year-end charts

Certifications and sales

!scope="row"|Slovakia
|align="left"|Platinum
|15,000
|-

}

See also
 List of best-selling Latin albums

References

External links 
 
 Album on Amazon.com
 Listen to samples
 Argentina 2001 Singles
 Greece Top 40 Singles

2000 albums
Thalía albums
Spanish-language albums
EMI Latin albums
Albums produced by Emilio Estefan
Albums produced by Cory Rooney
Latin Grammy Award for Best Engineered Album